Carlos Pedro Silva Morais (born 21 March 1976), commonly known as Caló, is a Cape Verdean retired footballer who played as a left winger.

Club career
Caló was born in Praia, bouncing back between clubs in his country and in the Portuguese lower leagues in his early career. In 2000 he signed for S.C. Salgueiros in the Primeira Liga of the latter nation, being sparingly used during two seasons and suffering relegation in his second.

Subsequently, Caló moved countries again, spending several years in Qatar in representation of two teams, mainly Al Ahli SC (Doha). In early 2010, aged nearly 34, he returned to his homeland, joining Sport Club Santa Maria and moving to former side Sporting Clube da Praia after a few months.

International career
Caló represented Cape Verde during nine years, his debut coming in 1998. He scored one of the national team's first ever goals in a FIFA World Cup qualification match, against Swaziland on 16 November 2003 (1–1 away draw).

References

External links

1976 births
Living people
Sportspeople from Praia
Footballers from Santiago, Cape Verde
Cape Verdean footballers
Association football wingers
Cape Verdean National Championships players
Santiago South Premier Division players
Sporting Clube da Praia players
SC Santa Maria players
Primeira Liga players
Segunda Divisão players
A.D. Ovarense players
S.C. Salgueiros players
Qatar Stars League players
Al Ahli SC (Doha) players
Al-Shamal SC players
Cape Verde international footballers
Cape Verdean expatriate footballers
Expatriate footballers in Portugal
Expatriate footballers in Qatar
Cape Verdean expatriate sportspeople in Portugal
Cape Verdean football managers